The year 1610 in science and technology involved some significant events.

Astronomy
 January 7 – Galileo Galilei first observes the four large Galilean moons of Jupiter: Ganymede, Callisto, Europa and Io, although he is unable to distinguish the latter two until the following night. In the same year he publishes his first observations by telescope in a short treatise entitled Sidereus Nuncius ("Sidereal Messenger").
 December – English scientist Thomas Harriot becomes one of the first to view sunspots through a telescope
 The Orion Nebula is discovered by Nicolas-Claude Fabri de Peiresc.

Medicine
 Diphtheria epidemic in Naples, during which Marco Aurelio Severino performs successful tracheotomies.

Technology
 Jean Beguin publishes Tyrocinium Chymicum, the first book of chemistry lectures.
 Tinsel is invented by a German silversmith, who uses real silver for the metal strands.
 Bagels are created in Krakow, Poland and given as gifts to women after childbirth.

Births
 February 2 – Pierre Bourdelot, French physician, anatomist, freethinker, abbé and libertine (died 1685)
 March 1 – John Pell, English mathematician (died 1685)
 Maria Cunitz, Silesian astronomer (died 1664)
 Marie Meurdrac, French chemist and alchemist (died 1680)

Deaths
 Abul Qasim ibn Mohammed al-Ghassani, Moroccan physician (born 1548)
 Nikola Vitov Gučetić, Ragusan polymath (born 1549)
 Peter Lowe, Scottish surgeon (born c. 1550)
 Paarangot Jyeshtadevan Namboodiri, Keralan mathematician and astronomer (born c. 1500)
 December 31 – Ludolph van Ceulen, German mathematician (born 1540)

References

 
17th century in science
1610s in science